Saudi copyright law was issued as per Royal Decree No. M/41 dated August 30, 2003. The Saudi copyright protects all of the intellectual works of any type, and the author rights will be protected until a period of 50 years after his/her death.

See also 

 Saudi Authority for Intellectual Property
 Saudi Patent Office

References

External links
 Full text of copyright law of a royal cecree No: M/41, from SAGIA  

Law of Saudi Arabia 
Saudi Arabia